Edwin Richard Sachs (February 11, 1918 – July 15, 1996) was an American professional basketball player. He played for the Chicago Bruins in the National Basketball League during the 1941–42 season and averaged 2.5 points per game.

References

1918 births
1996 deaths
American men's basketball players
Basketball players from Chicago
Chicago Bruins players
DePaul Blue Demons men's basketball players
Guards (basketball)